Drawbridge is a hamlet in the parish of St Neot (where the 2011 census was included), Cornwall, England, UK.

References

Hamlets in Cornwall